This is a summary of 1965 in music in the United Kingdom.

Events
 15 January – The Who release their first hitsingle "I Can't Explain" in the UK. It was released a month earlier in the US.
 17 January – The Rolling Stones drummer Charlie Watts' book, Ode to a High Flying Bird, a tribute to jazz great Charlie Parker, is published.
 21 January
 The Animals' show at New York's Apollo Theater is canceled after the U.S. Immigration Department forces the group to leave the theater.
 The Rolling Stones and Roy Orbison travel to Sydney to begin their Australian tour.
 23 January – "Downtown" hits #1 in the US singles chart, making Petula Clark the first British female vocalist to reach the coveted position since the arrival of The Beatles.
 24 January – The Animals appear a second time on The Ed Sullivan Show.
 27 January – Paul Simon broadcasts on BBC radio for the first time, on the Five to Ten show, discussing and playing thirteen songs, twelve of which would appear on his May-recorded and August-released UK-only solo album, The Paul Simon Song Book.
 6 February – Donovan gets his widest audience so far when he makes the first of three appearances on "Ready, Steady, Go!".
 12 February – NME reports that the Beatles will star in a film adaptation of Richard Condon's novel A Talent for Loving. The story is  about a  horse race that takes place in the old west. The film is never made.
 24 February –
 The Beatles begin filming their second film, Help!
 Richard Rodney Bennett's opera The Mines of Sulphur is premièred at Sadler's Wells Theatre in London.
 20 March – Kathy Kirby, singing the UK entry "I Belong", finishes second in the 10th Eurovision Song Contest in Naples, Italy, behind France Gall, representing Luxembourg.
 23 March – Benjamin Britten is appointed to the Order of Merit (OM).
 April – Michael Tippett is invited as guest composer to the music festival in Aspen, Colorado. The visit leads to major changes in his style.
 11 April – The New Musical Express poll winners' concert takes place featuring performances by The Beatles, The Animals, The Rolling Stones, Freddie and the Dreamers, the Kinks, the Searchers, Herman's Hermits, The Moody Blues, Wayne Fontana and the Mindbenders, Donovan, Cilla Black, Dusty Springfield and Tom Jones.
 5 May – Alan Price leaves The Animals, to be replaced temporarily by Mick Gallagher and permanently by Dave Rowberry.
 6 May – Keith Richards and Mick Jagger begin work on "Satisfaction" in their Clearwater, Florida hotel room. Richards came up with the classic guitar riff while playing around with his brand new Gibson "Fuzz box".
 8 May – The British Commonwealth comes closer than it ever had, or would, to a clean sweep of the US Hot 100's top 10, lacking only the #2 slot.
 30 May – The Animals appear for a third time on The Ed Sullivan Show.
 12 June – The Beatles are appointed Members of the British Empire (MBE) by the Queen. With no tradition of awarding popular entertainers such honours, a number of previous recipients complain and protest.
 June 14 – Paul McCartney records "Yesterday".
 July – John Cale, with his new collaborators Lou Reed and Sterling Morrison, makes a demo tape which he tries to pass on to Marianne Faithfull. These are the beginnings of the Velvet Underground.
 5 July – Maria Callas gives her last operatic performance, in the title role of Tosca, at the Royal Opera House, Covent Garden.
 13 July – The Beatles receive a record five Ivor Novello Awards.
 4 August – Iain Hamilton's Cantos receives its world première at The Proms, performed by the BBC Symphony Orchestra and conducted by Norman Del Mar.
 6 August
 The Small Faces release "Whatcha Gonna Do About It", their first single.
 The Beatles release the soundtrack to their second movie Help!
 27 August – The Beatles visit Elvis Presley at his home in Bel-Air. It is the only time the band and the singer meet.
 11 September – The Last Night of The Proms is conducted by Sir Malcolm Sargent, with Josephine Veasey as soloist for the traditional rendition of "Rule, Britannia.
 30 September – Donovan appears on Shindig! in the U.S. and plays Buffy Sainte-Marie's "Universal Soldier".
 17 October – The Animals appear for a fourth time on The Ed Sullivan Show.
 5 November – The Who release their iconic single "My Generation" in the UK. This song contains the famous line: "I hope I die before I get old"
 3 December
 The Beatles release their album Rubber Soul, along with the double A-sided single "Day Tripper / We Can Work It Out".  George Harrison's performance on the sitar on the track "Norwegian Wood" leads to his becoming a pupil of Ravi Shankar.
 The Who release their debut album My Generation.

Charts
 See UK No.1 Hits of 1965Classical music
New works
 Benjamin Britten – Songs and Proverbs of William Blake for baritone and piano
 Michael Tippett – The Vision of St Augustine (oratorio)
 William Walton – The Twelve, to a text by W. H. Auden
 Hugh Wood – Scenes from ComusMusical theatre
 24 August – The Passion Flower Hotel (music & lyrics by John Barry and Trevor Peacock, book by Wolf Mankowitz) opens at the Prince of Wales Theatre after a run in Manchester. 
 15 December – Charlie Girl (music & lyrics by David Heneker and John Taylor) opens at the Adelphi Theatre, London, starring Joe Brown and Anna Neagle.
 20 December – Twang! (music, lyrics and book by Lionel Bart) opens at the Shaftesbury Theatre, starring Ronnie Corbett, Barbara Windsor and James Booth.

Film and Incidental music
 John Barry – The Ipcress File, starring Michael Caine.
 Ron Goodwin – Those Magnificent Men in their Flying Machines, starring Sarah Miles, Robert Morley, Terry-Thomas and James Fox.
 Elisabeth Lutyens –
 Dr. Terror's House of Horrors directed by Freddie Francis, starring Peter Cushing and Christopher Lee.
 The Skull directed by Freddie Francis, starring Peter Cushing and Christopher Lee.
 Robert Simpson – Incidental music to Ibsen's play The Pretenders.

Musical films
 Be My Guest, starring David Hemmings and Steve Marriott
 Catch Us If You Can, starring the Dave Clark Five
 Every Day's a Holiday, starring John Leyton, Michael Sarne and Peter Birrell.
 Ferry Cross the Mersey, starring Gerry and the Pacemakers
 Help!, starring The Beatles
 Three Hats for Lisa, starring Joe Brown, Sid James, and Una Stubbs
 Up Jumped a Swagman, starring Frank Ifield, Annette Andre, and Suzy Kendall.

Jazz
 Stan Tracey – Under Milk Wood''

Births
 1 January – John Digweed, DJ, record producer, and actor
 4 January – Beth Gibbons, vocalist (Portishead)
 6 January – Murray McLachlan, Scottish pianist
 10 January - Nathan Moore, singer (Brother Beyond)
 14 January – Slick Rick, rapper
 20 January – Heather Small, soul singer (M People)
 22 January – Andrew Roachford, singer-songwriter and keyboard player 
 12 February – David Westlake, singer-songwriter and guitarist (The Servants)
 23 March – Marti Pellow, vocalist (Wet Wet Wet)
 1 April  – Robert Steadman, composer
 7 April - Yorkie (David Palmer), bassist (Space)
 15 April – Graeme Clark, bass guitarist (Wet Wet Wet)
 13 May – Tasmin Little, violinist
 23 May - Simon Gilbert, drummer (Suede)
 31 May – Lisa I'Anson, DJ
 6 June - David White, guitarist (Brother Beyond)
 7 June – Billy Reeves, English guitarist, songwriter, and producer (Theaudience)
 23 June – Paul Arthurs, guitarist (Oasis and The Rain)
 4 July – Jo Whiley, radio DJ
 6 July – Anthony Marwood, English violinist
 19 July – Dame Evelyn Glennie, percussionist
 28 July - Nick Banks, drummer (Pulp)
 13 September – Zak Starkey, drummer, son of Ringo Starr
 19 September – Goldie, electronic music artist and DJ
 2 October – Roy Powell, jazz pianist, organist and composer
 12 October - Phil Creswick, singer (Big Fun)
 9 November – Bryn Terfel, operatic bass-baritone
 21 December – Stuart Mitchell, pianist and composer

Deaths
 8 February – Winifred Christie, pianist and composer, 82
 8 June – Erik Chisholm, composer, 61
 18 June – George Melachrino, conductor, singer and composer, 56
 2 July – Charles Kennedy Scott, organist and choral conductor, 88
 4 July – Edward Sackville-West, 5th Baron Sackville, music critic, 63
 24 July – Irene Browne, actress and singer, 69
 9 October – Ernest Read, conductor, organist, and music educator, 86
 10 October – Herbert Kennedy Andrews, organist and composer, 61
 25 November – Dame Myra Hess, pianist, 75
 20 December – Henry George Farmer, musicologist, 83

See also
 1965 in British radio
 1965 in British television
 1965 in the United Kingdom
 List of British films of 1965

References

 
British Music, 1965 In
British music by year